Andreas Aabel (February 21, 1911 – December 29, 1948) was a Norwegian actor and translator.

Family
Andreas Aabel was the son of the actor Hauk Aabel and the actress Svanhild Johannessen, and the brother of the actor Per Aabel. He was the grandson of the physician and poet Andreas Leigh Aabel. He married Ellen Johanne Didriksen (1911–2001) in 1936.

Career
Aabel made his theater debut at the Central Theater in 1930. He appeared in five films between 1932 and 1948. Aabel died of a throat infection in 1948.

Filmography
1932: Prinsessen som ingen kunne målbinde  as Askeladd
1933: Jeppe på bjerget as the cobbler's apprentice
1938: Bør Børson Jr. as O. G. Hansen
1946: Et spøkelse forelsker seg as Fidias
1948: Kampen om tungtvannet as Kasper Idland

References

External links
 
 Andreas Aabel at the National Theater
 Andreas Aabel at the Swedish Film Database
 Andreas Aabel at Sceneweb

1911 births
1948 deaths
Norwegian male stage actors
Norwegian male film actors
20th-century Norwegian male actors
20th-century Norwegian translators